is a Japanese footballer currently playing as a goalkeeper for SC Sagamihara from 2023.

Career statistics

Club
.

Notes

References

External links

1999 births
Living people
Japanese footballers
Japanese expatriate footballers
Association football goalkeepers
V-Varen Nagasaki players
SC Sagamihara players
Japanese expatriate sportspeople in Singapore
Albirex Niigata Singapore FC players 
Expatriate footballers in Singapore